The 2022 Chennai Open was a professional women's tennis tournament played on outdoor hard courts. A part of the 2022 WTA Tour, this tournament marked the return of a WTA tournament in India for the first time since 2008.

The event was one of the six tournaments that were given single-year WTA 250 licenses in September and October 2022 due to the cancellation of tournaments in China during the 2022 season because of the ongoing COVID-19 pandemic, as well as the suspension of tournaments in China following former WTA player Peng Shuai's allegation of sexual assault against a Chinese government official.

Champions

Singles 

  Linda Fruhvirtová def.  Magda Linette, 4–6, 6–3, 6–4

This was Fruhvirtová's first WTA Tour singles title.

Doubles 

  Gabriela Dabrowski /  Luisa Stefani def.  Anna Blinkova /  Natela Dzalamidze, 6–1, 6–2

Points and prize money

Point distribution

Prize money 

1Qualifiers prize money is also the Round of 32 prize money.
*per team

Singles main-draw entrants

Seeds

† Rankings are as of 29 August 2022.

Other entrants
The following players received wildcards into the main draw:
  Eugenie Bouchard
  Ankita Raina
  Karman Thandi

The following player received entry into the singles main draw with a special ranking:
  Yanina Wickmayer

The following players received entry from the qualifying draw:
  Jana Fett
  Nao Hibino
  Liang En-shuo
  Kyōka Okamura
  Olivia Tjandramulia
  Mariia Tkacheva

Withdrawals 
 Before the tournament
  Caroline Garcia → replaced by  Despina Papamichail
  Elise Mertens → replaced by  Nadia Podoroska

Doubles main-draw entrants

Seeds 

 1 Rankings as of 29 August 2022.

Other entrants
The following pair received a wildcard into the doubles main draw:
  Sharmada Balu /  Riya Bhatia
  Eugenie Bouchard /  Yanina Wickmayer

Withdrawals
Before the tournament
  Victoria Jiménez Kasintseva /  Nadia Podoroska → replaced by  Rutuja Bhosale /  Karman Thandi
  Miyu Kato /  Asia Muhammad → replaced by  Justina Mikulskytė /  Emily Webley-Smith
  Julia Lohoff /  Astra Sharma → replaced by  Astra Sharma /  Ekaterina Yashina

References

External links 
 WTA tournament profile
 Official website

2022 WTA Tour
Sports competitions in Chennai
2020s in Tamil Nadu
Chennai Open
Chennai Open